Quercus coccifera, the kermes oak, is an oak bush  in the Ilex section of the genus. It has many synonyms, including Quercus calliprinos. It is native to the Mediterranean region and Northern African Maghreb, south to north from Morocco to France and west to east from Portugal to Cyprus and Turkey, crossing Spain, Italy, Libya, Balkans, and Greece, including Crete. The Kermes Oak was historically important as the food plant of the Kermes scale insect, from which a red dye called crimson was obtained. The etymology of the specific name coccifera is related to the production of red cochineal (crimson) dye and derived from Latin coccum which was from Greek κόκκος, the kermes insect. The Latin -fera means 'bearer'.

Description
It is evergreen, with spiny-serrated coriaceous leaves 1.5–4 cm long and 1–3 cm broad. The acorns are 2–3 cm long and 1.5–2 cm in diameter when mature about 18 months after pollination. They are held in a cup covered in dense, elongated, reflexed scales.

It blooms from March to May in weather still wet. It is easily propagated by seed, an acorn that lies dormant until germinated by wet weather. This might occur anywhere from late summer to late autumn or early winter (October, November or December) of the following year. The acorns are very bitter, varying greatly in size and shape from one specimen to another and tasting bad. Acorns can germinate even before falling from the plant, but Q. coccifera is also multiplied by root suckers and layering.

Taxonomy 
Quercus coccifera was first described by Carl Linnaeus in 1753. It is called "chêne des garrigues" (garrigue oak) in French. The term "garrigue" comes from Catalan or Occitan "garric" (meaning "twisted") the name for Q. coccifera in those languages. The common Spanish name of Q. coccifera is chaparro, which refers to its small size, a feature it shares with other oak species in similar habitats in other parts of the world, such as the chaparral communities from various parts of the Americas. The word chaparro comes from the Basque txapar meaning "little thicket". Quercus coccifera is placed in section Ilex.

Quercus calliprinos, the Palestinian oak, of the eastern Mediterranean, has been distinguished from the kermes oak by its larger size (more often a tree, up to 18 m) and larger acorns over 2 cm diameter. In Israel it is called the common oak or the Palestine oak. , Plants of the World Online regards it as a synonym of Quercus coccifera.

Distribution and habitat 

Quercus coccifera is an important Mediterranean bush or dwarf vegetation, where the biome it dominates often bears its name (maquis, coscojar, garrigue, carrascal, chaparral, etc.). Q. coccifera forms monospecific communities or communities integrated with Pinus, mediterranean buckthorns, Myrtus, Arecaceae, junipers, Pistacia, Rosmarinus, Thymus, etc.

It is located throughout the region around the Mediterranean Sea, especially in central southern and eastern halves. It is similarly found on islands in the Mediterranean, from the Balearic Islands to Cyprus. It is common in Crete and can survive heavy sheep and goat grazing for long periods as a ground cover a few centimeters high. The same is true in Mallorca, Ibiza and the Iberian peninsula.

The species grows on dry, sunny slopes. In its habitat summers are hot and winters are cold with the dry summer season with more than 35 °C, occasionally reaching over 40 °C. In winter the temperatures often drop below 0 °C. It lives in areas with moisture produced by condensation fogs, many Ground frost on clear nights and sporadic snowfalls.

A very hardy species, it grows well in all types of soils as a shrub, withstanding overgrazing.
It is indifferent to soil chemistry, living on calcareous, pebbly, stony and poor soils.
It is capable of supporting the continental Mediterranean climate with extreme temperatures and low rainfall, replacing Quercus ilex (holm oak) in drier areas where it excels in drought resistance. It also grows on sea cliffs and in windy areas where other species of Quercus or Pinus cannot resist the harsh weather conditions.

Ecology 

Populations typically occur in desert regions without any inhabited nucleus because crops are not economically profitable and the climate becomes progressively more continental and drier and therefore end in extreme temperatures accompanied by slow-growing dwarf juniper species. It is the last species of genus Quercus to disappear when rainfall is lacking. Their ecological importance is as a habitat and food source in these areas (they have edible acorns, although with a very bitter taste) for nesting birds, foxes, rodents and wild boars. It forms thickets, thorny and dense, some recorded as tall as 5 m. It is sometimes accompanied by other plant species of the same size and climber plants such as asparagus or zarzaparrilla.

Q. coccifera is associated with several asparagus species, Crataegus monogyna, Mediterranean dwarf palm, ephedra, myrtle, several species of Junipers (Juniperus, sabinas...), Pistacia terebinthus, mastic, wild Olea europea, sarsaparilla, Rhamnus atlantica, Rhamnus lycioides, Rhamnus oleoides, Rhamnus catharticus etc. The communities receiving several characteristic names.

Kermes oaks have become scarce due to their replacement in wet zones by larger species such as Holm oak. It has also suffered from extensive culling for use as charcoal. It is the only food and shelter for wildlife in some areas, such as the Ebro valley and other dry areas where chaparral replaces oaks due to low rainfall.

It can survive heavy sheep and goat grazing for a long time as a ground carpet a few cm high, and will grow higher as a bush or a tree according to how much the grazing pressure is slackened.

Conservation
It is included as an endangered species in the Red Book of Bulgaria.

Notable specimens 
In Cyprus village of Kalopanagiotis,  the tallest tree of this species has grown to a height of 17 meters.  The tree is approximately  700 years old.

See also 

 Mediterranean forests, woodlands, and scrub
 Kermes (dye)

References 

coccifera
Flora of North Africa
Trees of Europe
Plants described in 1753
Taxa named by Carl Linnaeus
Flora of the Mediterranean Basin